Nama or NAMA may refer to:

Biology
 NAMA (gene), a long non-coding RNA gene
 Nama (plant), a genus of plants in the family Boraginaceae
 N-Acetylmuramic acid, a component of bacterial cell walls
 North American Mycological Association, a learned society devoted to mushrooms and other fungi

Companies
 Nama Chemicals, a Saudi Arabian industrial company
 Nama (department store), a chain of department stores in Slovenia and a chain of department stores in Croatia

Food
 Nama beer, Japanese term for draught beer
 Nama (wine), used by the Greek Orthodox in the Divine Liturgy

Politics
 National Asset Management Agency, Irish government agency dealing with land and property development loans
 Nationally Appropriate Mitigation Action, policies regarding greenhouse gas emissions
 Non-Agricultural Market Access, the question of non-agricultural market access as debated in the WTO trade negotiations

Organizations
 National Agri-Marketing Association, United States
 National Archaeological Museum, Athens
 National Automatic Merchandising Association, an American trade association for vending industries
 Swedish National Academy of Mime and Acting

Places
 Nama, Burkina Faso, village in the Tenkodogo Department, Boulgou Province
 Nama (Chile), an archaeological site featuring pucará (ruined Inca fortifications)
 Nama (crater), a crater on Callisto, a moon of Jupiter
 Nama, India, a village at the foot of the Nama Pass
 Nama (island), an island of the State of Chuuk in the Federated States of Micronesia
 Nama, Nanning (那马镇), town in Liangqing District, Nanning, Guangxi, China
 Nyoma, a village in India

Peoples and languages
 Nama people of Namibia and Namaqualand in South Africa
 Nama language, the language spoken by the Nama
 Nama language (Papuan), one of the Nambu languages of Papua New Guinea
 Nama, a variety of the Tigon language of Cameroon

Other uses
 Nāma, Pali and Sanskrit for "name"
 Nama band, a Greek pop/jazz/new age music group
 Namibian Annual Music Awards
 Native American Music Awards
 National Arts Merit Awards, annual award presented by the National Arts Council of Zimbabwe

See also
 Naamam, the identification mark of South Indian Vaishnavites
 Namah (disambiguation)

Language and nationality disambiguation pages